Salahlı (also, Salahly) is a village and municipality in the Yevlakh District of Azerbaijan. It has a population of 2,569.

References

Populated places in Yevlakh District